Kabasalan, officially the Municipality of Kabasalan (Chavacano: Municipalidad de Kabasalan), is a 2nd class municipality in the province of Zamboanga Sibugay, Philippines. According to the 2020 census, it has a population of 46,884 people.

History
The first inhabitants of the place are of Subanen origin. Kabasalan comes from the word basal, meaning to play the agung, a musical instrument which is a favorite pastime of the Subanon. It was during the old times that the whole peninsula was resonating with the sound of that instrument. Every Subanen family owns a set of the instrument.

Kabasalan was greatly affected by Typhoon Tembin (2017) which most of the municipality where flooded.
Schools were destroyed due to strong winds.

Geography

Barangays
Kabasalan is politically subdivided into 29 barangays.

Climate

Demographics

Economy

Media
Kabasalan and its neighboring towns is being served by Flash-FM 91.3 MHz and Countryside Cable Television, Inc.

References

External links
 Kabasalan Profile at PhilAtlas.com
 [ Philippine Standard Geographic Code]
Official website of the Municipal Government of Kabasalan

Municipalities of Zamboanga Sibugay